The Burning Season is the fourth studio album by Faith and the Muse.

Track listing

Credits 
 All instruments and voices performed by William Faith and Monica Richards except:
 Drums on Tracks 1, 2, 3 & 11 by Chad Blinman
 Violins on 10 & 12 performed and recorded by Matt Howden/Sieben at Redroom, Sheffield, England
 "Gone To Ground" performed with the Happy One-Time Orchestra at Cafe Society
 Produced by Faith and the Muse
 Additional programming and treatments by Chad Blinman
 All songs composed by Faith and the Muse © Elyrian Music 2003, BMI except:
 "Willow's Song" written by Paul Giovanni
 Recorded by William Faith at Wisperthal, Los Angeles, California January - April 2003
 Mixed by Chad Blinman at the Eye Socket, Venice, California
 Mastered by Joe Gastwirt at Joe Gastwirt Mastering, Oak Park, California
 Photos by Clovis IV
 Design and Layout by Monica Richards
 William Faith used Schecter Guitars exclusively for this album.
 Original lyrics by Monica Richards, except "Failure to Thrive", written by William Faith.

References

Faith and the Muse albums
2003 albums